The 2007 FIBA Europe Under-20 Championship Division B was the third edition of the Division B of the FIBA Europe Under-20 Championship, the second-tier level of European Under-20 basketball. The city of Warsaw, in Poland, hosted the tournament. Montenegro won their first title.

Montenegro and Ukraine were promoted to Division A.

Teams

Squads

Preliminary round
The eighteen teams were allocated in four groups (two groups of five teams and two groups of four). The two top teams of each group advanced to the Qualifying Round. The last three teams of each group advanced to the Classification round.

Group A

Group B

Group C

Group D

Qualifying round
The eight top teams were allocated in two groups of four teams each. Teams coming from the same initial group didn't play again vs. each other, but "carried" the results of the matches played between them for the first round.

Group E

Group F

Classification round
The ten bottom teams were allocated in two groups of four teams each. Teams coming from the same initial group didn't play again vs. each other, but "carried" the results of the matches played between them for the first round.

Group G

Group H

Knockout stage

17th–18th game

15th–16th game

13th–14th game

11th–12th game

9th–10th game

5th–8th playoffs

Championship

Final standings

Stats leaders

Points

Rebounds

Assists

References
FIBA.com
FIBA Europe Archive

FIBA U20 European Championship Division B
2007–08 in European basketball
2007–08 in Polish basketball
International youth basketball competitions hosted by Poland
2000s in Warsaw
July 2007 sports events in Europe
Sports competitions in Warsaw